Center Township is a township in Vernon County, in the U.S. state of Missouri.

Center Township was erected in 1855, and named for the fact the geographical center point of Vernon County lies within its borders.

References

Townships in Missouri
Townships in Vernon County, Missouri